Crofton Pumping Station, near the village of Great Bedwyn in Wiltshire, England, supplies the summit pound of the Kennet and Avon Canal with water.

The steam-powered pumping station is preserved and operates on selected weekends. It contains an operational Boulton & Watt steam engine dating from 1812, making it the oldest working beam engine in the world in its original engine house and capable of doing the job for which it was installed.

Description 

When the canal was built, no reliable water sources were available to fill the summit by normal gravitational means. Arrangements were made for these springs to feed the pound below lock 60 at Crofton Locks. Some years later a reservoir (Wilton Water) was created to improve the supply to this pound, and this can now be seen across the canal from the pumping station.

The pumps take the water from this well and discharge it into a feeder channel next to the pumping station.

For day-to-day operation, the pumping station now uses electric pumps, automatically controlled by the water level in the summit pound. However, the original steam driven pumping equipment has been preserved and is still operational. A single operable Lancashire boiler provides steam to the engines.

It drives a  lift pump capable of lifting , or approximately one ton of water, per stroke, at a rate of 11 strokes a minute.

It drives a  force pump capable of lifting , or approximately one ton of water, per stroke, at a rate of 10.2 strokes a minute.

When the Great Western Railway built its railway line through the area, it passed very close to the station and between it and the canal. Access between the canal side and the pumping station is now via a very low roofed tunnel.

History 

The pumping station was built between 1807 and 1809 in time for the opening of the canal in 1810. The station was built to house two pumping engines, but only one, a  bore engine bought second-hand from the West India Dock Company, was initially installed.

In 1810 a second engine was ordered from Boulton and Watt. This engine, which started work in 1812, is the current number 1 engine, and has been the main engine throughout the steam-driven life of the station.

In 1846 the original 1809 engine was replaced by a new engine supplied by Harvey and Co. and built as a double-acting Sims patent combined cylinder engine. However, this engine proved troublesome and eventually fell into disuse.

In 1903 the 1846 engine was rebuilt as a simple single-acting engine and thus became the current number 2 engine. Both engines then continued in regular use until the 1950s, when the state of the chimney forced the removal of the top . The reduced height chimney was unable to provide sufficient draught for the boiler, and it proved cheaper to retire the steam engines and install electric pumps.

In 1968 the pumping station was bought by the Kennet and Avon Canal Trust with restoration in mind. The building and both engines were restored, and the existing irreparable boiler replaced with another of the same type acquired second hand. Number 1 engine was first successfully steamed on 4 April 1970 and the pumping station was officially reopened on 21 August the same year by John Betjeman. Number 2 engine was first successfully steamed on 15 November 1971.

The pumping station was designated as Grade I listed in 1985.

In July 2009, the modern electric pumps at Crofton failed. While awaiting repair, British Waterways contacted the Kennet and Avon Canal Trust who put Crofton into steam.

In 2012 the Boulton and Watt engine celebrated its 200th birthday. Several special steamings were held, including a visit from the Duke of Gloucester.

Visiting 
The pumping station opens to visitors and the engines are in steam on designated days.

Location 

Position: 

Nearby towns and cities: Hungerford, Marlborough, Newbury, Swindon

Nearby villages: Great Bedwyn, Wilton, East Grafton, Burbage, Pewsey

Nearby places of interest: Wilton Windmill, Wolfhall, Crofton Locks, Bruce Tunnel

See also 
Claverton Pumping Station, another restored pumping station on the Kennet and Avon canal

References

Bibliography
 Booklet 'Crofton Pumping Station' edition 2, printed by ESP Color Ltd in 2001, no explicit publisher or copyright details but believed to be published by the Kennet and Avon Canal Trust. Obtained from Crofton Pumping Station in 2004.

External links 

Georgian architecture in Wiltshire
Kennet and Avon Canal
Industrial archaeological sites in the United Kingdom
Grade I listed industrial buildings
Preserved beam engines
Grade I listed buildings in Wiltshire
Museums in Wiltshire
Steam museums in England
Canal museums in England
Water supply pumping stations
Cornish engines
Infrastructure completed in 1812
Former pumping stations